Xestia renalis is a moth of the family Noctuidae. It is known from Punjab.

References

Xestia
Moths of Asia